Ifeanyi Eze  (born 7 May 1999) is a Nigerian footballer who plays as a forward for Nigeria Professional Football League club  Kano Pillars.

References

Living people
1999 births
Association football forwards
Nigerian footballers
Nigeria Professional Football League players
Akwa United F.C. players
Sportspeople from Anambra State